The Chapman Report is a 1962 American Technicolor drama film starring Shelley Winters, Jane Fonda, Claire Bloom and Glynis Johns. It was made by DFZ Productions and distributed by Warner Bros. It was directed by George Cukor and produced by Darryl F. Zanuck (who previously worked at WB until 1933) and Richard D. Zanuck, from a screenplay by Wyatt Cooper and Don Mankiewicz, adapted by Gene Allen and Grant Stuart from Irving Wallace's 1960 novel The Chapman Report. The original music was by Leonard Rosenman, Frank Perkins and Max Steiner, the cinematography by Harold Lipstein, the color coordination images and main title design by George Hoyningen-Huene, and the costume design by Orry-Kelly.

Plot
Noted psychologist Dr. George C. Chapman (Andrew Duggan), his assistant Paul Radford (Efrem Zimbalist Jr) and their staff are flying around the country conducting an anonymous sex survey of American women. They come to Los Angeles looking for volunteers in an affluent community called Briarwood. In a speech to the Briarwood Women's Club, Chapman says that “Too many women suffer from too little knowledge about a subject that occupies a major and crucial part of their lives...My associates and I believe that through our findings these women will come to realize that sex is decent, clean and dignified.“

The turnout at the club is lower than expected—82 instead of 150 women–because Dr. Jonas (Henry Daniell) is campaigning against the project. He tells Radford that he deplores the fact that all their research and writing is devoted to the physical act. “This is separating sex from affection, warmth, tenderness, devotion.” Dr. Jonas insists that by not discussing love at all, they allow people to believe—incorrectly—that the data on the physical act are the way to measure love. “People read the digits, make the comparisons, and then label themselves either normal or abnormal.” Dr. Jonas is also very concerned that the interviews, with their probing questions, may stir up trouble for some women—with no follow-through to help them. Radford later tells Chapman that Jonas has some good points.

The film follows four of the participants:

Kathleen Barclay (Jane Fonda) is a young widow who thinks she is “frigid” because, not long before her late husband died, her cruel husband told her she was. She breaks down in tears during the interview (conducted by Radford), drops her purse and flees. When Radford returns her wallet, she recognizes his voice. She becomes distraught, protesting that she “is not one of his pathological cases.” However, she and Radford fall in love, and she comes to terms with her fears.

Teresa Harnish (Glynis Johns), a vivacious, happily married woman, recognizes her interviewer as Dr. Chapman. She records everything to play back for her husband. Listening, she suddenly thinks they may be abnormal—abnormally boring. Her pursuit of brawny, young football player Ed Kraski (Ty Hardin) ends in farce. When he finally understands what she wants, he grabs her eagerly, and her fantasy dissolves in his clumsy, bone-crushing embrace. “You can't toss me around like a football,” she declares and runs for home.

Sarah Garnell (Shelley Winters) is a middle-aged wife and mother whose lover, the young director of the local little theater, Fred Linden (Ray Danton), is supposedly separated from his wife. Her husband, Frank (Harold J. Stone), thinks all is well. When she is interviewed, she classifies their sexual relationship as “tolerable”. They have sex every Saturday. She describes her affair, weeping. The subsequent questions make her think for the first time about the future, and she eventually decides to leave her husband. She leaves a note and her wedding ring for Frank and goes to Fred's boat to find Fred's wife, waiting. Fred won't see her. Sarah goes back to her stricken husband, who tells her that he meant “for better or for worse” and returns her ring.

Divorcée Naomi Shields (Claire Bloom) is a promiscuous alcoholic who may be suffering from what is currently referred to as hypersexuality. When we first see her, she seduces a stranger, water-delivery guy Bob Jensen (Chad Everett). Wash Dillon (Corey Allen), an unsavory jazz musician who lives down the block, takes her to a crummy apartment and they have sex. When she wakes up, Dillon allows his friends to gang rape her, then dumps her in her driveway. When the time comes for her interview, she first says that she had sex with many in her early teens, then that it was not until after she was 21. She cheated on her husband constantly. The marriage ended when he found her with a 20-year-old neighbor. She now wants “to crawl back to the musician.” She attempted suicide after the rape, but swallowed too many pills and threw up. She goes home, calls Dillon and tells him she'll leave the door open. This time, she takes just enough pills. When she is found dead, Dr. Jonas blames the interview as a contributing factor. Radford says she was lost long ago.

Dr. Chapman and Radford are reviewing the data from the Briarwood interviews. They pause to reflect on the reassuring statistics showing that the vast majority of American marriages are happy. Radford shares the news: He and Kathy are engaged.

Cast
 Shelley Winters as Sarah Garnell
 Jane Fonda as Kathleen Barclay
 Claire Bloom as Naomi Shields
 Glynis Johns as Teresa Harnish
 Efrem Zimbalist Jr as Paul Radford
 Ray Danton as Fred Linden
 Ty Hardin as Ed Kraski
 Andrew Duggan as Dr. George C. Chapman
 John Dehner as Geoffrey Harnish
 Harold J. Stone as Frank Garnell
 Corey Allen as Wash Dillon
 Jennifer Howard as Grace Waterton
 Cloris Leachman as Miss Selby
 Chad Everett as Bob Jensen
 Henry Daniell as Dr. Jonas
 Jack Cassidy as Ted Dyson

Production
Based on Irving Wallace's novel that was based on the Kinsey Reports, the film was originally conceived for 20th Century Fox to attract customers with discussions and depictions of sexual matters that would not be allowed on American television. Darryl F. Zanuck was having problems with Fox during the production of two widescreen epic spectacular films for the studio in Europe, Cleopatra and The Longest Day at the same time. When Fox would not do the film, Zanuck offered the property, his son the producer, director Cukor and the female stars to his friend and rival Jack L. Warner.

Warner Brothers replaced the film's planned male leads with their own Warner Brothers Television contract leads who received no extra money to do the film. Warner Brothers felt that casting these performers would attract their fans to the film, while at the same time pleasing the stars who had requested more interesting and different material than they had at Warners. Efrem Zimbalist Jr was given top billing over the four female stars, however in posters produced in some overseas countries his name was shifted down in favour of the better known Shelley Winters and Jane Fonda.

Andrew Duggan played a character based on Dr. Alfred Kinsey; Efrem Zimbalist Jr played one of his researchers, who meets and interviews the four women depicted in the film. The leading ladies consist of Shelley Winters as an adulterous middle-aged housewife having an affair with artist Ray Danton; Jane Fonda as a young widow who believes she is frigid but who is in fact reacting to her husband's violence during sex; Glynis Johns as a trendy older woman infatuated with athletic young beach boy Ty Hardin; and Claire Bloom as a “nymphomaniac”.

Costume designer Orry-Kelly dressed each of the different female characters in only one color throughout the film.

As many as seven different writers worked on the film with Gene Allen, who was contracted to Cukor's organisation delivering the final screenplay. The film attracted much criticism during its production by the Legion of Decency amongst others.

Reception
After a screening at San Francisco where Cukor claimed the audience liked the film, the studio recut the film. At the Legion of Decency's insistence, Jack Warner had Michael A. Hoey reedit the film and wrote a different ending with Zimbalist and Duggan saying that American women were rather normal sexually, a message at odds with the rest of Cukor's film. A different director was brought in to reshoot it. Cukor said of Bloom: "Claire is not a nice Nellie. She has no inhibitions, and she is not as cold as some people say".

The film attracted criticism for being "the sexiest mainstream movie ever made". Upon the film's general release, The New York Times wrote "the four adapters use four case histories of abnormal sexual behavior of upper middle-class women of a Los Angeles suburb who subject themselves to the testing of a psychologist's team of investigators. They touch, unfortunately only superficially, on a frigid type, a nymphomaniac-alcoholic, a confused, bored mother and a gay, flighty intellectual seeking enlightenment in romance. The interplay and lack of depth in the treatment of these glimpses at the intimate life sometimes appear more prurient than scientific. And a viewer's emotions rarely, if ever, are fully engaged in following the affairs."

The film was rated M in New Zealand for violence and sex scenes, and it was previously rated R18.

See also
 List of American films of 1962

References

Bibliography

External links
 
 
 
 

1962 films
1962 drama films
Films about sexuality
Films set in Los Angeles
Films directed by George Cukor
Warner Bros. films
American drama films
1960s English-language films
Films scored by Leonard Rosenman
Films produced by Darryl F. Zanuck
Films produced by Richard D. Zanuck
Films based on American novels
Films based on works by Irving Wallace
1960s American films